The Wilmington Waves were a minor league baseball team in Wilmington, North Carolina in the 2001 baseball season. They were a Low-A class team that played in the South Atlantic League, and were a farm team of the Los Angeles Dodgers for the franchise’s only year in Wilmington. They played all of their home games at Brooks Field, on the campus of the University of North Carolina Wilmington. However, at least in part because Brooks Field is not easy to spot on campus nor centrally located on it, attendance for the Waves' home games was substantially low. Because of this, the Waves were given a limited amount of time to find a new stadium or build a new one. The deadline was not met and, prior to the 2002 season, the Wilmington Waves were sold and moved to Albany, Georgia, where the franchise became the South Georgia Waves.

List of Wilmington Waves players in the MLB
All players are listed in alphabetical order by their surname, with the year they played for Wilmington in parentheses.
 Reggie Abercrombie (2001)
 Willy Aybar (2001)
 Joselo Díaz (2001)
 Ben Diggins (2001)
 Tom Goodwin (2001)
 Joel Hanrahan (2001)
 Koyie Hill (2001)
 Ruddy Lugo (2001)
 Agustín Montero (2001)
 Jason Repko (2001)
 Lino Urdaneta (2001)
 Shane Victorino (2001)

Year-by-year record

References

Defunct South Atlantic League teams
Los Angeles Dodgers minor league affiliates
Sports in Wilmington, North Carolina
2001 establishments in North Carolina
2001 disestablishments in North Carolina
Baseball teams established in 2001
Sports clubs disestablished in 2001
Professional baseball teams in North Carolina